The Adana MTB Cup is an international mountain biking race annually held in Adana since 2010. It is a class 2, Cross-country olympic (XCO) race performed in 4 different categories; Men elite, Women elite, men junior, women junior.

Adana MTB Cup is the first leg of the XCO discipline UCI racing season in Turkey. The race is held every year in the first half of March and it is organised by the Turkish Cycling Federation.

Winners

Adana MTB Cup 2016
Adana MTB Cup 2016  is held on March 6 at the 80.Yıl Woods in Balcalı neighbourhood. Other than the 4 UCI categories, there were races in 5 more categories. Total of 174 cyclists joined races in 9 categories.

References

Adana
Recurring sporting events established in 2010
2010 establishments in Turkey
Sport in Adana
Annual events in Turkey
Spring (season) events in Turkey